May Week is the name used in the University of Cambridge to refer to a period at the end of the academic year. Originally May Week took place in the week during May before year-end exams began. Nowadays, May Week takes place in June after exams, and is a cause for great celebration amongst the students of the University. Highlights of the week include bumps races, May Balls, June Events and garden parties.

History

May Week festivities were originally held in May, in the final week before exams; however, the May boat races, also known as the May Bumps, moving toward June, right after exams to celebrate the year end.

Suicide Sunday

Suicide Sunday is the name used at Cambridge University to refer to the Sunday immediately after the end of the summer term (known as Easter Term). By this Sunday, all students have finished exams but most of the results have not been published, so it is traditionally a period of nerves and suspense. The name, however, refers to the celebration of the end of exam term, in contrast to Caesarian Sunday on the day before the early May Bank Holiday which celebrates the birth of exam term. A student-led campaign in 2015 encouraged use of the name "May Week Sunday" instead, though "Suicide Sunday" continues to persist among students and the public.

The event is for current students of the University of Cambridge but is frequented by former students that indulge in the student lifestyle.

The Cardboard Boat Race is a main attraction to Suicide Sunday, offering an alternative to the many garden parties and more serious boating. The first race was in 2010, with three boats from Magdalene College. In 2011, the race was opened to other colleges.

May Week Alternative 
May Week Alternative (MWA), is a "feel good" initiative set up by undergraduates at Cambridge University to encourage students to celebrate the end of the academic year through charitable endeavours. In the organisation's first 3 years, it attracted the support of approximately 650 students, and raised £150,000, protecting almost 180,000 people from malaria according to the Against Malaria Foundation.

Aims 
The organisation states three main aims:

 Direct impact: MWA seeks to raise money for AMF and in doing so transform tens of thousands of lives by providing life-saving anti-malaria nets.
 Put charity at the heart of May Week celebrations: The initiative attempts to equip students with a positive framework which allows them to celebrate May Week by making the world a better place. By inviting students to see charity as a central and positive part of the May Week experience, MWA believes it can "unlock huge philanthropic potential".
 Inspire students with a bold, positive vision for giving: By inviting students to engage with significant giving through this explicitly positive, celebratory context, May Week Alternative hopes that students will develop philanthropic tendencies which they will take forward into their future careers, rather than seeing charity as a burden.

Chronology 

 In the spring of 2018, a group of five students founded the initiative and raised £12,000 for AMF, with over 40 students joining.
 In February 2019 MWA hosted its first annual Launch Party. MWA also presented at various events, including the Cambridge International Development Conference, Cambridge Union, and TEDxCambridgeUniversity
 In the same month it was one of only four initiatives recognised at Cambridge University's first ever Social Impact Awards.
 In March 2019, MWA raised over £36,000 (having acquired matched funding), with more than 170 students joining. This total was triple the previous year and according to AMF's calculations is sufficient protect 40,000 people from malaria.
 In June 2019 the initiative hosted a Summer Party with over 140 participants, and the support of 11 university and corporate partners.
 In 2020, the cancellation of all May Balls and other May Week events as a result of the COVID-19 pandemic lead to the creation of The May Week Mega Event. Co-hosted by May Week Alternative, Cambridge Rag (student society), and the May Ball Presidents' Committee, this virtual celebration of May Week featured over 500 performers from across the university in a four and a half hour livestream, attracting over 10,000 viewers. Over the course of the evening, over £14,000 was raised to support Addenbrooke's Charitable Trust and the Centre for the Study of Existential Risk.

References

Terminology of the University of Cambridge
June events
Culture of the University of Cambridge
English traditions